This is a list of notable reggaeton artists (musicians, singers and producers) and groups.

Argentina
Bizarrap
Cazzu
Duki
 Emilia
J Mena
Khea
Lali
Lit Killah
María Becerra
Nathy Peluso
Nicki Nicole 
Oriana
Paulo Londra
Tiago PZK
Tini
Trueno
WOS

Brazil
Anitta
Francinne
Luísa Sonza
Pabllo Vittar

Chile
Denise Rosenthal
Paloma Mami
Polimá Westcoast

Colombia

Cuba

Dominican Republic

El Salvador
Crooked Stilo
Heavy Clan
Pescozada

Mexico
Alemán
C-Kan
Danna Paola
Ingratax
Kenia Os
Kim Loaiza
MC Davo
Sofia Reyes
Thalía

Nicaragua
Torombolo

Panama

Peru 
Leslie Shaw
Faraón Love Shady
Wendy Sulca
La Tigresa del Oriente

Puerto Rico

Spain
Abraham Mateo
Aitana
Ana Mena
Bad Gyal
Enrique Iglesias
K-Narias
Lola Indigo
Mala Rodriguez
Omar Montes
Rosalía

United States

Venezuela
Calle Ciega
Chino & Nacho
Corina Smith
Danny Ocean

References

 
Reggaeton